The View from the Hill is a solo album released in 1996 by Justin Hayward of The Moody Blues.

Track listing
All songs written by Justin Hayward unless noted.

"I Heard It" - 5:37
"Broken Dream" - 5:52
"The Promised Land" (Paul Bliss, Phil Palmer) - 7:26
"It's Not Too Late" - 5:02
"Something to Believe In" (Paul Bliss, Phil Palmer) - 4:22
"The Way of the World" - 5:08
"Sometimes Less Is More" (Dennis Lambert, Hayward) - 4:08
"Troubadour" - 6:34
"Shame" - 4:35
"Billy" - 7:00
"Children of Paradise" (Hayward, Mickey Féat) - 3:15

Personnel
Justin Hayward - Guitar, Keyboards, Vocals
Elio Rivagli - Drums, Percussion
Mickey Feat - Bass, Vocals
Paul Bliss - Keyboards, Pre-Production
Phil Palmer - Guitar, Vocals
Geoffrey Richardson - Voila, Mandolin, Various Pipes
Helen Liebmann - Cello
Tessa Niles - Background Vocals
Lynda Taylor - Background Vocals
Billy Nichols - Background Vocals

References

Justin Hayward albums
1996 albums